Diaphragmatic spasm can refer to:

 Hiccups (synchronous diaphragmatic spasm or flutter)
 Getting the wind knocked out of you (transient or temporary diaphragmatic spasm)
 Bornholm disease (epidemic transient diaphragmatic spasm)